Jan-Michael Charles Gambill (born June 3, 1977) is an American former professional tennis player who made his professional debut in 1996. His career-high singles ranking is world No. 14, which he achieved on June 18, 2001. Best known for his unusual double-handed forehand, Gambill reached the quarterfinals of the 2000 Wimbledon Championships, the final of the 2001 Miami Masters, and won three singles titles.

Early life

Gambill spent the early years of his life in the countryside of Spokane, Washington. He currently resides in both Los Angeles, California and Kailua-Kona, Hawaii with his partner, architect and developer Malek Alqadi. While Jan-Michael has been sponsored by car manufacturer Jaguar, he also supports real-life Jaguars and tigers through Cat Tales Zoological Park, an organization dedicated to saving the lives of big cats. Gambill has also raised money for his long-time friend Sir Elton John's charity, the Elton John AIDS Foundation.
 
Gambill's high-profile career as a professional athlete has evolved into coaching world-class tennis players as well as being an international analyst for BeIn sports. Gambill was also sponsored by Prince for both his racquets and apparel.

Tennis career

1996–2005
Gambill began playing tennis at the age of five, looking up to multiple Grand Slam singles titlists Jimmy Connors and John McEnroe. He has defeated, amongst other top players, former World No. 1s, Roger Federer, Carlos Moyá, Lleyton Hewitt, Gustavo Kuerten, Marcelo Rios, Jim Courier, Pete Sampras, and Andre Agassi, as well as Grand Slam champions Michael Chang, Thomas Johansson, Sergi Bruguera, and Gastón Gaudio. His best performances at Grand Slams have been reaching the quarterfinals of Wimbledon in 2000 and the fourth round of the US Open in 2002. His run at Wimbledon in 2000 saw him beat Lleyton Hewitt, Fabrice Santoro, Paul Goldstein and Thomas Enqvist before losing to eventual champion Pete Sampras. His run to the final of the 2001 Miami Masters included wins over Hewitt, Gaudio, and Thomas Enqvist. He was coached by his father Chuck Gambill (1947–2020), who coached Jan-Michael's younger brother Torrey, who was also pro tennis player.

Throughout his career, Gambill was hampered by numerous injuries. Most prominently, while still in the world's top 40, he suffered a recurring shin condition, which severely limited him on the ATP Tour after 2004. He also started serving harder to try and compensate for lack of movement, which resulted in a shoulder injury.

Post–2005
Gambill played for the Boston Lobsters in the World Team Tennis league from 2008 on, alongside other successful American players such as Andre Agassi, John Isner, and Robby Ginepri.

In September 2009, Gambill reached the semifinals of the USA F23 Futures tournament (losing to second seed Michael McClune) in his first pro match of the year.

He competed in three Challenger events in 2010, and reached the quarterfinals of the USA F25 Futures in Irvine, California. Since October 2010, Gambill has not competed on the pro tour.

Since July 2011, he has coached top 10 player Coco Vandeweghe, his former Boston Lobsters teammate, on the WTA Tour. In 2017, he coached top 50 player Jared Donaldson on the ATP Tour. As of 2020, he is currently in broadcasting and television as a Sports Analyst on the Tennis Channel.

Personal life
Gambill is gay and in a relationship with architectural designer and model Malek Alqadi.

ATP Tour finals

Singles (3 titles, 4 runner-ups)

Performance timeline

References

External links
 
 
 

1977 births
American male tennis players
Gay sportsmen
Hopman Cup competitors
American LGBT sportspeople
LGBT tennis players
Living people
Sportspeople from Spokane, Washington
Tennis people from Hawaii
Tennis people from Washington (state)